The coat of arms of the Republic of Serbia is the coat of arms determined by the Law on the Coat of Arms of the Kingdom of Serbia of June 16, 1882. It was officially readopted by the National Assembly in 2004 and later slightly redesigned in 2010.  The coat of arms consists of two main heraldic symbols which represent the national identity of the Serbian people across the centuries, the Serbian eagle (a silver double-headed eagle adopted from the Nemanjić dynasty) and the Serbian cross (or cross with firesteels).

Description 

The official description of the greater coat of arms of Serbia is "The greater coat of arms is a red shield, on it between two golden fleurs-de-lys in base, a double-headed silver eagle, armed gold and with the same tongue and legs, with a red shield on the chest, on which is a silver cross between four firesteels with their backs turned to the pale of the cross. The shield is crowned with a golden crown and surrounded with a mantle embroidered with gold, decorated with golden fringes, tied with a golden rope with tassels of the same, lined with ermine and crowned with a golden crown." While the official description of the lesser coat of arms is "The lesser coat of arms is a red shield, on it between two golden fleurs-de-lys in base, a double-headed silver eagle, armed gold and with the same tongue and legs, with a silver shield on the chest, on which is a silver cross between four firesteels with their backs turned to the pale of the cross. The shield is crowned with a golden crown."

The principal field stands for the Serbian state. It consists of a white double-headed eagle on a red shield; its body and wings in white, and tongues, beaks, legs and claws in gold, between two golden fleur-de-lis. The inescutcheon stands for the Serbian nation; in a red shield, a cross in the midst of four firesteels.

A blazon in heraldic terms is: Gules, a bicephalic eagle Argent armed Or, two fleurs-de-lys Or. Overall an escutcheon Gules, a cross Argent between four firesteels Argent. All crowned with a royal crown.
The design on the inescutcheon has been used by Serbian states and the Serbian church since the Middle Ages. The four shapes around the central cross are a stylized form of letters, as explained above.

Although Serbia is now a republic, the coat of arms features monarchist imagery like the royal crown of the former Serbian monarchy, and the ermine mantle, which is often present on the coats of arms of many European monarchies as well as on that of Jordan. The lesser arms is used more frequently, appearing on passports, identity cards, driver's licenses, and the state flag.

Eagle 

 
The use of the double-headed eagle dates back to the late Byzantine era (since the 11th century). The figure often appears on inscriptions, medieval frescoes and embroidery on the clothes of Byzantine and Serbian royalty. Grand Prince Stefan Nemanja (r. 1166–1196) was among the first in Serbia who used the symbol. The Serbian Orthodox Church also adopted it; the entrance of the Žiča monastery, which was the seat of the Archbishop of the Serbs between 1219–1253, and by tradition the coronational church of the Serbian kings, is engraved with the double-headed eagle. The surviving golden ring of Queen Teodora (1321–1322) has the symbol engraved. The Nemanjić dynasty (1166–1371) coat of arms was the double-headed eagle.

During the reign of Emperor Stefan Dušan (r. 1331–1345), the double-headed eagle was used on everyday objects and state-related documents, such as tax stamps and proclamations. In 1339, the map-maker Angelino Dulcert marked the Serbian Empire with a flag with a red double-headed eagle. Other Serbian dynasties also adopted the symbol as a symbolic continuation, such as the Mrnjavčević and Lazarević. Prince Lazar (r. 1371–1389), when renovating the Hilandar monastery of Mount Athos, engraved the double-headed eagle at the northern wall. The Codex Monacensis Slavicus 4 (fl. 1371–1389) has richly attested artwork of the Serbian eagle. The double-headed eagle was officially adopted by Stefan Lazarević after he received the title of despot, the second highest Byzantine title, from John VII Palaiologos in August 1402 at the court in Constantinople.

Cross

The Serbian Cross, surrounded by four firesteels,  possibly also derives from a Byzantine emblem. It strongly resembles the imperial emblem used in Byzantine flags during the late (Palaiologan) age. As a Byzantine symbol though, it might date back to several centuries earlier. Serbian historian Stanoje Stanojević argues that it was officially adopted as a Serbian symbol as well in 1345, with Dušan the Mighty's raising to a Serbian Empire. In contrast, Stojan Novaković posits that the recorded use of the Serbian cross, as a national symbol, began in 1397, during the rule of Stefan Lazarević. It was possibly derived from a known candle chandelier from the Visoki Dečani. 
Later, the Serbian cross is found in the Korenić-Neorić Armorial (1595), which shows the coat of arms of Serbia (Svrbiae) as a white cross over a red and gold background, also depicting the Mrnjavčević noble house with the same design, with inverted colours and the Serbian eagle in the center of the cross.  According to Mavro Orbini (1607), it was used by Vukašin Mrnjavčević (King, 1365–1371) and Lazar Hrebeljanović (Prince, 1371–1389). Miloš Obrenović adopted the Serbian cross as the military flag when forming the first units of the regular army in 1825. The Serbian cross then appeared on all Serbian coats of arms, except the Serbian coat of arms dated 1947, which had the cross removed, leaving only the four stylized firesteels; this was done symbolically by the Yugoslav government to "socially curtail and politically marginalize religious communities and religion in general".

In modern times, a Serbian folk etymology interpreted the firesteels  around the cross as a stylised form of Cyrillic "C", a belief which is sometimes reflected on older coats of arms. In all of these coat of arms though (see gallery below), the figures retain the straight side of the letter B, or at least a projection in the middle, that is the middle part of "B" between the two semicircles.

The Palaiologan cross as the Serbian coat of arms first appeared in Pavao Ritter Vitezović's book Stemmatografia (1701). After its publication, the Serbian church (Metropolitanate of Karlovci) began using the symbol, and its popularity grew until Milos Obrenovic adopted it as official in 1838.

History

See also 

Serbian eagle
Double-headed eagle
Serbian cross
Armorial of Serbia
Serbian heraldry
Coat of arms of Triballia

Notes

References

Sources

External links 

Serbia
 
National symbols of Serbia
Serbia
Serbia
Serbia
Serbia
Serbia